Crisis Management State Academy (CMSA) is a state-owned public academy in Yerevan, Armenia. Founded in 1992, the academy is committed to training professionals in fire protection, rescue missions machinery, risk management, security operations, civil defense and rescue operations, offering bachelor's and master's degree programs.

The academy is on 1 Acharyan Street, in the Avan District of Yerevan. It is directed by the Ministry of Emergency Situations of Armenia.

The Stepanavan branch of the academy is operating since 2006.

Degree programs

Bachelor degree
The academy offers the following programs in the bachelor's degree (3–4 years):
Civil Defence
Civil Defence (correspondence course)
Economics - Crisis Management
Fire Protection
Fire Protection (correspondence course)
Management
Operation and Servicing of Special Transport and Fire Rescue Machinery and Equipment
Operation and Servicing of Special Transport and Fire Rescue Machinery and Equipment
Economics - Crisis Management (correspondence course)
Pedagogy - Emergency Security Operations
Pedagogy - Emergency Security Operations (correspondence course)
Rescue Operations
Rescue Operations (correspondence course)

Master degree
The academy offers the following programs in the master's degree (1–2 years):
Economics - Crisis Management (correspondence course)
Rescue Operations (correspondence course)

Advanced education programs
Training of Specialists in Emergency Management
Training of Specialists in Fire Protection
Training of Specialists in Operation and Servicing of Fire Rescue Machinery

References

Educational institutions established in 1992
Education in Yerevan
1992 establishments in Armenia